Mount Picciotto is a prominent, mainly ice-free mountain, 2,560 m, surmounting the northeast end of Painted Cliffs on Prince Andrew Plateau, Queen Elizabeth Range. Named by Advisory Committee on Antarctic Names (US-ACAN) for Edgard E. Picciotto, glaciologist at South Pole Station, 1962–63; South Pole—Queen Maud Land Traverse I and II, 1964–65 and 1965–66.

Mountains of the Ross Dependency
Shackleton Coast